Taklai Gewog is a former gewog (village block) of Sarpang District, Bhutan. Taklai Gewog, together with Serzhong, Bhur, and Gelephu Gewogs, belongs to Gelephu Dungkhag.

References

Former gewogs of Bhutan
Sarpang District